Maksym Serhiyovych Perekhodko (born 31 March 2002) is a Ukrainian professional footballer who plays as a central midfielder for Ukrainian Second League club Zvyahel Novohrad-Volynskyi, on loan from Veres Rivne.

References

External links
 
 

2002 births
Living people
Ukrainian footballers
Association football midfielders
FC ODEK Orzhiv players
NK Veres Rivne players
FC Zvyahel Novohrad-Volynskyi players
Ukrainian Second League players
Ukrainian Amateur Football Championship players